The 1995 Speedway Grand Prix of Poland was the first race of the 1995 Speedway Grand Prix season. It took place on 20 May in the Olympic Stadium in Wrocław, Poland.

Starting positions draw 

The Speedway Grand Prix Commission nominated Dariusz Śledź as Wild Card. Josh Larsen was replaced by Mikael Karlsson
Draw 10.  (9) Josh Larsen →  (17) Mikael Karlsson
Draw 17.  (17) Mikael Karlsson →  (18) Billy Hamill
Draw 18.  (18) Billy Hamill →  (19) Peter Karlsson

Heat details

The intermediate classification

See also 
 Speedway Grand Prix
 List of Speedway Grand Prix riders

References

External links 
 FIM-live.com
 SpeedwayWorld.tv

Speedway Grand Prix of Poland
P
1995
Sport in Wrocław